Copenhagen is an unincorporated community in Caldwell Parish, Louisiana, United States. It is located northeast of Holum, on Highway 849, west and south of the Ouachita River. Its ZIP code is 71418.

References

Unincorporated communities in Caldwell Parish, Louisiana
Unincorporated communities in Louisiana